Time in South Ossetia, which claims independence but is widely recognized as being part of Georgia, is given by Moscow Standard Time (MSK; UTC+03:00). South Ossetia does not currently observe daylight saving time.

History
South Ossetia switched from Georgia Standard Time to Moscow Standard Time on 26 October 2014.

References

South Ossetia